Barbara London may refer to:

 Barbara London (curator), American art curator
 Barbara Erickson London (1920–2013), military pilot in World War II